Asparagus is a type of vegetable.

Asparagus may also refer to:

 Asparagus (genus), the name of a genus of plants
 Asparagus (color), a brownish shade of green that resembles the plant asparagus
 Asparagus (film), a 1979 American experimental animated short film

See also
 List of Asparagus species
 
 Asparagus beetle
 Asparagus Island, Cornwall, England